The Venus of Mauern  (also: Rote von Mauern, "the red one of Mauern") is a Venus figurine from the paleolithic era. The statuette stems from the Gravettian and is about 27.000 years of age. The figurine consists of red painted limestone and was found in 1948 in Mauern (Rennertshofen). It is housed in the Archäologische Staatssammlung in Munich.

History 
The excavations were led by the prehistorian Lothar Zotz from the university of Erlangen in 1948/49. The amateur archeologist Christoff von Vojkffy found the figurine in the Weinberghöhlen ("vineyard caves") near Mauern at 24 August 1948. The figurine was found at the hill between cave 2 and 3.

Description 

The figurine is 7,2 cm high, made of limestone and is covered with red ochre. The statuette can be interpreted  in two ways: as a stylized depiction of a woman with large buttocks or as a penis with testicles. At the upper side is a deepening, which can be interpreted as the ending of the urethra. 
This kind of double-sexed depiction can also be found in several other figurines of the paleolithic era, among them sculptures from Dolni Vestonice, Gönnersdorf, Nebra, Mezin (Ukraine), Milandes, Oelknitz, Savignano, Trasimeno und Trou Magrite.

See also 
 Paleolithic art
 Venus of Monruz
 Venus figurines of Gönnersdorf
 Venus of Willendorf

References

Further reading 
 Karl Dietrich Adam, Renate Kurz: Eiszeitkunst im süddeutschen Raum. Theiss, Stuttgart 1980.
 Assien Bohmers: Die Höhlen von Mauern I. Kulturgeschichte der altsteinzeitlichen Besiedlung. (= Palaeohistoria 1). J. B. Wolters, Groningen 1951.
 Michael Bolus: Settlement Analysis of Sites of the Blattspitzen Complex in Central Europe. In: J. N. Conard (Hrsg.): Settlement dynamics of the Middle Paleolithic and Middle Stone Age II. Tübingen 2004, S. 201–226.
 Claus-Stephan Holdermann, Hansjürgen Müller-Beck, Ulrich Simon (Hrsg.): Eiszeitkunst im süddeutsch-schweizerischen Jura: Anfänge der Kunst. Theiss, Stuttgart 2001, S. 53.
 Henri Delporte: L’image de la femme dans l’art préhistorique. Ed. Picard, 1979, S. 132 f.
 Wighard von Koenigswald, Hansjürgen Müller-Beck, Erich Pressmar: Die Archäologie und Paläontologie in den Weinberghöhlen bei Mauern (Bayern). Grabungen 1937–1967. (= Archaeologica Venatoria, Band 3). Institut für Urgeschichte, Tübingen 1974.
 Hansjürgen Müller-Beck, Gerd Albrecht: Die Anfänge der Kunst vor 30000 Jahren. Theiss, Stuttgart 1987.
 Hermann Müller-Karpe: Handbuch der Vorgeschichte I, Altsteinzeit. München 1966, S. 299–301.
 Lothar Zotz (Hrsg.): Das Paläolithikum in den Weinberghöhlen bei Mauern. Röhrscheid-Verlag, Bonn 1955.

External links 

 Don Hitchcock (Don's Maps): "The Venus of Die Rote von Mauern - the Red Venus from the Weinberghöhlen near Mauern"

1948 archaeological discoveries
Archaeological discoveries in Germany
Gravettian
Limestone sculptures
Sculptures in Germany
Mauern